Allium howellii is a North American species of wild onion known by the common name Howell's onion. It is endemic to California.

Description
Allium howellii is a tall onion plant, producing a stem which may exceed half a meter in height from a reddish-brown bulb one to two centimeters long. There is a single cylindrical leaf about as long as the stem. The inflorescence holds up to 100 dark-veined lavender to white flowers, each under a centimeter long.

Varieties
Several varieties have been named:
 Allium howellii var. clokeyi Ownbey & Aase ex Traub - San Bernardino, Los Angeles, Ventura, Santa Barbara counties
 Allium howellii var. howellii - Merced, Fresno, Kern, San Luis Obispo counties
 Allium howellii var. sanbenitense (Traub) Ownbey & Aase  - San Benito County

Distribution and habitat
Howell's onion grows in the granite and serpentine soils of several mountain ranges, hills, and valleys from San Joaquin County to San Bernardino County.

References

External links
 Calflora Database: Allium howellii (Howell's onion)
 Jepson eFlora (TJM2): Allium howellii 
UC Photos gallery of Allium howellii 

howellii
Endemic flora of California
Natural history of the California chaparral and woodlands
Natural history of the California Coast Ranges
Natural history of the Transverse Ranges
~
Plants described in 1938
Taxa named by Alice Eastwood